Doongul is a rural locality in the Fraser Coast Region, Queensland, Australia.

Geography 
The former town of Eliott is within Doongul on the Old Gayndah Road.

History 
The locality was previously known as Muskat Flat. It presumably takes its present name Doongul from the Doongul parish and Doongul Creek, which are thought to take their name from the Doongal pastoral run, described in 1862 as being  from Maryborough.

On 18 July 1864, 39 town lots were offered for sale in Eliott.

In 1877,  of land was resumed from the Lower Doongul pastoral run to establish smaller farms. A further  was resumed from the Doongul pastoral run. The land was offered for selection on 17 April 1877.

References

External links 

 Map of the Parish of Doongul, 1976
 Map of the Town of Eliott, 1981

Fraser Coast Region
Localities in Queensland